Nils Ronald Åhman (or Åman, born 31 January 1957) is a former Swedish footballer.

He played his career in Örebro SK and in Djurgårdens IF as a midfielder, and he was selected to the Sweden national football team for the 1978 FIFA World Cup. He later joined the Djurgårdens IF board.

Honours 

 Djurgårdens IF 
 Division 2 Norra: 1982

References

External links
 
 
 
 

1957 births
Living people
Swedish footballers
Sweden international footballers
Sweden youth international footballers
1978 FIFA World Cup players
Allsvenskan players
Division 2 (Swedish football) players
Örebro SK players
Djurgårdens IF Fotboll players
Djurgårdens IF Fotboll directors and chairmen
Association football defenders